Brad or Bradley Young may refer to:

 Brad Young (cricketer) (born 1973), Australian cricketer
 Brad H. Young (born 1955), American biblical scholar
 Brad Young (footballer) (born 2003), English footballer
 Brad Young, co-founder of music production company Underground Productions, Inc.